CKVB-FM (Bay of Islands Radio) is a Canadian radio station. The station broadcasts a country/community radio format at 100.1 FM in Corner Brook, Newfoundland and Labrador.

Since 2011, Bay of Islands Radio has maintained a full-time internet stream, broadcasting programs from a wide variety of topics and music genres produced by its volunteers. The station also broadcasts many local events that are of interest to the public, such as the bi-weekly live broadcast of Corner Brook City Council. The station is registered as a non-profit organization, and is operated entirely by volunteers from the surrounding communities of the Bay of Islands.

The station was founded in partnership with the Grenfell Campus Student Union (GCSU) and College of the North Atlantic, and was operated on the premises of Memorial University's Grenfell Campus until January 2015; it moved to a new facility on Brook Street at this time, which was donated by the City of Corner Brook.

On February 12, 2016, the station submitted an application to the CRTC for a license to operate a low power FM community radio station. The license approval was issued on October 6, 2016.

On November 5, 2017, the station launched its new broadcast signal on 100.1 FM in the Corner Brook area. Its transmitter is located in the Humber Heights area of Corner Brook. The new signal reaches as far as McIvers and Frenchman's Cove to the west, Little Rapids to the east, and Logger's School Road to the south.

As of March 2022, Bay of Islands Radio is the only radio station (excluding CBC) which originates local programming from Corner Brook. On March 9, 2022, Stingray Radio closed both of its local studios for CKXX-FM and CFCB and replaced them with simulcast feeds of their sister stations in St. John's. These closures, along with the closures of studios in Gander on the same date, leaves the province of Newfoundland & Labrador, outside of St. John's, without any commercial radio stations. 

On October 17, 2022, Corner Brook City Council approved the sale of a piece of land off Mayfair Avenue to Bay of Islands Radio for the purpose of constructing a new transmitter site, citing coverage issues at its current site.  The land was sold to the station at a cost of $1.00. The location of the land is adjacent to the former transmitter site of CHOZ-FM and CJON-DT's Corner Brook repeaters, until the tower was dismantled in 2014 following the closure of NTV's analogue television network.

References

External links
Bay of Islands Radio
CKVB-FM history - Canadian Communication Foundation
BOIR | NCRA

HBB
HBB